In applied mathematics, k-SVD is a dictionary learning algorithm for creating a dictionary for sparse representations, via a singular value decomposition approach. k-SVD is a generalization of the k-means clustering method, and it works by iteratively alternating between sparse coding the input data based on the current dictionary, and updating the atoms in the dictionary to better fit the data. It is structurally related to the expectation maximization (EM) algorithm. k-SVD can be found widely in use in applications such as image processing, audio processing, biology, and document analysis.

k-SVD algorithm 
k-SVD is a kind of generalization of k-means, as follows.
The k-means clustering  can be also regarded as a method of sparse representation. That is, finding the best possible codebook  to represent the data samples   by nearest neighbor, by solving

which is nearly equivalent to

which is k-means that allows "weights".

The letter F denotes the Frobenius norm. The sparse representation term  enforces k-means algorithm to use only one atom (column) in dictionary .

The k-SVD algorithm follows the construction flow of the k-means algorithm.

So, the objective function becomes

or in another objective form

As finding the truly optimal  is hard, we use an approximation pursuit method. Any algorithm such as OMP, the orthogonal matching pursuit can be used for the calculation of the coefficients, as long as it can supply a solution with a fixed and predetermined number of nonzero entries .

After the sparse coding task, the next is to search for a better dictionary . However, finding the whole dictionary all at a time is impossible, so the process is to update only one column of the dictionary  each time, while fixing . The update of the -th column is done by rewriting the penalty term as 

where  denotes the k-th row of X.

By decomposing the multiplication  into sum of  rank 1 matrices, we can assume the other  terms are assumed fixed, and the -th remains unknown.  After this step, we can solve the minimization problem by approximate the  term with a   matrix using singular value decomposition, then update  with it. However, the new solution of vector  is very likely to be filled, because the sparsity constraint is not enforced.

To cure this problem, define  as

which points to examples  that use atom  (also the entries of  that is nonzero). Then, define  as a matrix  of size , with ones on the  entries and zeros otherwise. When multiplying , this shrinks the row vector  by discarding the zero entries. Similarly, the multiplication  is the subset of the examples that are current using the  atom.

So the minimization problem as mentioned before becomes 

 
and can be done by directly using SVD. SVD decomposes  into . After updating the whole dictionary, the process then turns to iteratively solve X, then iteratively solve D.

Limitations
Choosing an appropriate "dictionary" for a dataset is a non-convex problem, and k-SVD operates by an iterative update which does not guarantee to find the global optimum. However, this is common to other algorithms for this purpose, and k-SVD works fairly well in practice.

See also
 Sparse approximation
 Singular value decomposition
 Matrix norm
 k-means clustering
 Low-rank approximation

References

Norms (mathematics)
Linear algebra
Cluster analysis algorithms